Quintus Sertorius (c. 126 – 73 BC) was a Roman general and statesman who led a large-scale rebellion against the Roman Senate on the Iberian peninsula. He had been a prominent member of the populist faction of Cinna and Marius. During the later years of the civil war of 83–81 BC, he was sent to recover the Iberian Peninsula. When his faction lost the war he was proscribed (outlawed) by the dictator Sulla. Supported by a majority of the native Iberian tribes, Sertorius skillfully used irregular warfare to repeatedly defeat various commanders sent by Rome to subdue him. He was never decisively beaten on the battlefield and remained a thorn in the Senate's side until his murder in 73 BC.

The famous Greek biographer Plutarch dedicated one of his Parallel Lives to Sertorius; in it he pairs Sertorius with Eumenes. Like Eumenes, Sertorius was betrayed by his own men.

Early life and career
Sertorius was born in Nursia (a town whose people had received Roman citizenship in 268 BC) in Sabine territory around 126 BC. The Sertorius family were minor aristocrats, almost certainly Equites Romani (usually called "knights" in English), the class directly below the senatorial class. His father died before he became of age and his mother, Rhae, focused all her energies on raising her only son. She made sure he received the best education possible for a young man of his status. In return, according to Plutarch, he became excessively fond of his mother. Like many other young domi nobiles Sertorius moved to Rome in his mid-to-late teens trying to make it big as an orator and jurist.

He made enough of an "impression" on the young Cicero to merit a special mention in a later treatise on oratory:

Of all the totally illiterate and crude orators, well, actually ranters, I ever knew – and I might as well add 'completely coarse and rustic' – the roughest and readiest were Q. Sertorius ...

After his undistinguished career in Rome as a jurist and an orator, he entered the military. His first recorded campaign was under Quintus Servilius Caepio and ended at the Battle of Arausio in 105 BC, where he showed unusual courage. Serving under Gaius Marius, Sertorius succeeded in spying on the wandering Germanic tribes that had defeated Caepio. After this success, he almost certainly fought at the great Battle of Aquae Sextiae (now Aix-en-Provence, France) in 102 BC in which the Teutones and the Ambrones were decisively defeated. He probably also fought at the Battle of Vercellae in 101 BC, where the Cimbri were decisively defeated, ending the German invasion. A few years after the Cimbric wars, Sertorius's patron Gaius Marius fell out of grace for his support of the demagogue Lucius Appuleius Saturninus and he and Sertorius had to get out of Rome for a while. Sertorius travelled to Hispania Ulterior and served its governor, Titus Didius, as a military tribune. He distinguished himself by putting down an insurrection in and around Castulo and was awarded the Grass Crown.

Social War and Civil War

In 91 BC, he was elected quaestor and served in Cisalpine Gaul, where he was in charge of recruiting and training legionaries for the Social War. During the war he sustained a wound that cost him the use of one of his eyes. 
Sertorius used his wounds as personal propaganda. Being scarred in the face had its advantages. 'Other men, he used to say, could not always carry about them the evidence of their heroic achievements. Their tokens, wreaths and spears of honour must at some times be set aside. His proof of valour remained with him at all times.'
Upon his return to Rome he ran for tribune of the Plebs, but Lucius Cornelius Sulla thwarted his efforts (for reasons unknown, but probably because he was in Marius's clientele, and Sulla and Marius were at odds), causing Sertorius to oppose Sulla. Sertorius, however, did manage to become a senator on the strength of his earlier quaestorship.

In 88 BC, after being sidelined by his political opponents, Sulla marched his legions on Rome and took the capital. He took revenge on his enemies and forced Marius into exile, Sulla then left Italy to fight the First Mithridatic War against Mithridates VI of Pontus. After Sulla left, violence erupted between the optimates, led by the consul Gnaeus Octavius, and the populares, led by the consul Lucius Cornelius Cinna. Sertorius, being a former subordinate of Marius, declared for Cinna and the populares. When Cinna was driven from Rome he and Sertorius started recruiting ex-legionaries and drumming up enough support to enable them, in their turn, to march on Rome. Though he had a very bad opinion of Marius by then, he consented to Marius's return upon understanding that Marius came at Cinna's request and not of his own accord.

Oh, really? Here I was thinking that Marius had decided for himself to come to Italy, and so I was trying to decide what good it would do. But it turns out there's nothing to discuss. Since after all, you invited him, then you have to receive and employ him. There's no question about it.

In October of 87 BC, Cinna marched on Rome, Sertorius commanded one of Cinna's divisions and fought a battle with troops commanded by Pompeius Strabo. After Octavius surrendered Rome to the forces of Marius, Cinna, and Sertorius, Sertorius abstained from the proscriptions his fellow commanders engaged in. Sertorius went so far as to rebuke Marius, and move Cinna to moderation. After Marius's death he annihilated Marius's slave army which was still terrorizing Rome.

The years 87-84 BC are often described as spent 'waiting for Sulla'. Marius died in January 86 BC. Cinna was murdered in 84 BC, lynched by his own troops. It is probable that Sertorius became praetor in the year Cinna died.

On Sulla's return from the East in 83 BC a civil war broke out. Sertorius, a praetor now, was called upon to serve in the government's armies. When the consul Scipio Asiaticus marched against Sulla, Sertorius was part of his staff. Sulla arrived in Campania and found the other consul, Gaius Norbanus, blocking the road to Capua. At the Battle of Mount Tifata Sulla inflicted a crushing defeat on Norbanus, with Norbanus losing six thousand of his men to Sulla's seventy.  The beaten Norbanus withdrew with the remnants of his army to Capua. Sulla was stopped in his pursuit by Scipio's advance. However, Scipio was unwilling to risk a battle and started negotiations. Sertorius did not trust Sulla, and advised Scipio to force a decisive action. Instead he was sent to Norbanus to explain that an armistice was in force and negotiations were underway. Sertorius made a detour along his way and captured the town of Suessa which had gone over to Sulla. When Sulla complained to Scipio about this breach of trust he was given back his hostages as a sign of good faith. This behavior of their commander caused Scipio's troops to lose faith in him. Unwilling to fight Sulla's battle hardened veterans they defected. Scipio and his son were found cowering in their tents and brought to Sulla, who released them after extracting a promise that they would never again fight against him or rejoin Carbo.  In 82 BC, Marius' son, Gaius Marius the Younger, became consul without having held the offices which a candidate for the consulship should have held, and at the unconstitutional age of 27. Sertorius, who probably qualified for the office, objected but his opinion was ignored. Plutarch sums up the events:

 Cinna was murdered and against the wishes of Sertorius, and against the law, the younger Marius took the consulship while [ineffectual] men as Carbo, Norbanus and Scipio had no success in stopping Sulla's advance on Rome, so the Marian cause was being ruined and lost; cowardice and weakness by the generals played its part, and treachery did the rest, and there was no reason why Sertorius should stay to watch things going from bad to worse through the inferior judgement of men with superior power.

Propraetor of Hispania and Fugitive

After having fallen out with the new populares leadership Sertorius was sent to Hispania as propraetor, representing the Cinna-Marian faction and their cause in Spain. When Sertorius marched through the Pyrenees mountain range he ran into severe weather and a mountain tribe which demanded a tribute for allowing his passage. His companions indignantly claimed it was an outrage; but while they considered it disgraceful to give in to extortion, Sertorius simply paid the tribe and commented that he was buying himself time, and that if a man had a lot to do, nothing is more precious than time. The governor of the two Spanish provinces, Hispania Ulterior and Hispania Citerior, Gaius Valerius Flaccus did not recognize his authority, but Sertorius had an army at his back and used it to assume control. Then he persuaded the local chieftains of accepting him as the new governor and endeared himself with the general population by cutting taxes. After gaining control of both provinces Sertorius sought to hold them by sending an army, under Julius Salinator, to fortify the pass through the Pyrenees; however, Sulla's forces, under the command of Gaius Annius Luscus, broke through after Salinator was assassinated by Calpurnius Lanarius, who defected to the Sullans.

Unable to convince the Spanish tribes to fight for him, Sertorius was seriously outnumbered and he decided to abandon his provinces. With 3,000 of his most loyal followers he fled to Mauritania, but was driven off by the locals who wanted no part of his rebellion. He then fell in with a band of Cilician pirates who were pillaging the Spanish coast. Together they attacked and took Pityussa, the most southerly of the Balearic Islands, which they started using as a base. When this was reported to Annius Luscus, he sent a fleet of warships and almost a full legion which drove Sertorius and his pirate allies from the Balearics. The pirates defected and went to Africa to help install the tyrant Ascalis on the throne of Tingis. Sertorius followed them to Africa, rallied the locals in the vicinity of Tingis, who were unhappy with Ascalis for they saw him as a puppet of Sulla, and defeated Ascalis's men and the pirates in battle.

After gaining control over Tingis, Sertorius defeated Paccianus, one of Sulla's generals, who had been sent to put Ascalis on the throne.

Local legend had it that Antaeus, the son of Poseidon and Gaia, and the husband of Tinge who gave name to Tingis, was buried in Mauritania. Sertorius had the tomb excavated for he wanted to see the body of Antaeus which was reported to be sixty cubits in size. According to Plutarch, Sertorius was dumbfounded by what he saw and after performing a sacrifice, he filled the tomb up again, and thereafter was among those promoting its traditions and honours.

The North African success won him the fame and admiration of the people of Hispania, particularly that of the warlike Lusitanians in the west, whom Roman generals and proconsuls of Sulla's party had plundered and oppressed. The Lusitanians, being threatened by a Sullan governor again, asked Sertorius to be their war leader. Sertorius decided to accept the Lusitanian offer and prepared his army and fleet to return to Hispania.

Sertorian War

On a moonless night in the year 80 BC, Sertorius sailed his forces from Tingis across the Gibraltar strait back to Hispania. A small fleet under Aurelius Cotta from the coastal town of Mellaria tried to stop him, but he pushed them aside and landed his army at the small fishing town of Baelo near the Pillars of Hercules. After being reinforced by the Lusitanians he marched on Lucius Fufidius, the local Roman governor, intent on defeating him to strengthen his support and prestige. At the Battle of the Baetis River, fought at the Baetis estuary, he defeated Fufidius and started to consolidate his power in Hispania.

Brave, noble, and gifted with eloquence, Sertorius was just the man to impress the native warriors, whom he organized into an army. They spoke of him as the "new Hannibal" whom he resembled physically (having one eye) and in military skill; he was an extraordinary general who repeatedly defeated forces many times his own force's size. Many Roman and Italian refugees and deserters joined him, and with these and his Spanish and African volunteers and mercenaries he completely defeated several of Sulla's generals (Fufidius, Domitius Calvinus and to some less-direct extent Thorius and Manlius). In 77 BC he drove Quintus Caecilius Metellus Pius the proconsul of Hispania Ulterior, who had been given a proconsular command specifically to defeat him, out of his own province.

In 76 BC, after Sertorius had been reinforced by the rebel army of Marcus Perperna, the Roman Senate resorted to giving an extraordinary command (pro consulibus) to Gnaeus Pompey Magnus to help out Metellus who was doing miserably against Sertorius. Pompey recruited a large army from among his father's and Sulla's veterans and marched to Spain. Confident of success he engaged Sertorius at the Battle of Lauron in eastern Spain only to suffer a major defeat.

The turning point came in 75 BC when Pompey and Metellus started scoring victories against Sertorius's subordinates. Pompey defeated Sertorius's legates Marcus Perperna and Gaius Herennius at the Battle of Valentia and Metellus defeated Hirtuleius at the Battle of Italica. Sertorius then ruined his army at the Battle of Sucro and the Battle of Saguntum, forcing him on the defensive. From then on Sertorius refrained from fighting battles and reverted to guerrilla warfare. Although Pompey and Metellus had gained the initiative, the war was far from over. Sertorius still enjoyed the support of the inland tribes and their warriors still flocked to his cause.

Sertorius owed some of his success to his prodigious ability as a statesman. His goal was to build a stable government in Hispania with the consent and co-operation of the people, whom he wished to civilize along the lines of the Roman model. He established a senate of 300 members, drawn from Roman emigrants (probably also including some from the highest aristocrats of Hispania) and kept a Hispanian bodyguard. For the children of the chief native families he provided a school at Osca (Huesca), where they received a Roman education and even adopted the dress and education of Roman youths. This followed the Roman practice of taking hostages. Late in his campaigns, a revolt of the native people arose and Sertorius killed several of the children that he had sent to school at Osca, selling many others into slavery.

Although he was strict and severe with his soldiers, he was particularly considerate to the people in general, and made their burdens as light as possible. It seems clear that he had a peculiar gift for evoking the enthusiasm of the native tribes, and we can understand how he was able to use his famous white fawn, a present from one of the natives that was supposed to communicate to him the advice of the goddess Diana, to his advantage.

Spanus, one of the commononers who lived in the country came across a doe trying to escape from hunters. The doe fled faster than he could pursue, but the animal had newly given birth. He [Spanus] was struck by the unusual colour of the fawn, for it was pure white. He pursued and caught it.
As it happened, Sertorius was in the area, and it was known that he amply rewarded those who brought him game and produce. So Spanus gave the fawn to Sertorius, who at that time felt only the usual pleasure of one who receives such gift. 
After a while the animal became so tame and well-trained that it came when he called it, and followed him on his walks without minding the crowds and bustle of life in camp. [That the fawn did this tells us something more about the character of Sertorius.] Eventually it occurred to him that the barbarians easily fall into superstition, so he started to give the fawn religious significance.
He announced that the doe had been sent by [the goddess] Diana, and solemnly claimed that through the doe she revealed hidden information to him. He helped the idea along by various tricks. If he heard of an enemy raid into his territory, or an attempt to subvert a city from its allegiance to him, he would claim that the fawn had told him of this in a dream, and tell his men to prepare.
Or when his commanders sent him messages of victory, he would hide the messenger and bring out the white fawn wearing celebratory garlands. He would sacrifice to the gods, and tell his men to celebrate because they would soon hear something good had happened.
By such stratagems he persuaded his people they were not by the fallible wisdom of some foreigner, but by divine power. So the people were made tractable and all the more ready to help him with his plans, and consequently the extraordinary growth of Sertorius's power led to reinforcing this belief.

For six years he held sway over Hispania. In 76 BC, he was joined — at the insistence of the forces he brought with him — by Marcus Perpenna Vento, with a following of Roman and Italian aristocrats and a sizeable Roman-style army of fifty-three cohorts. In the same year, Gnaeus Pompeius Magnus (now better known as Pompey) was sent to help Metellus take back Hispania and crush Sertorius's rebellion. Contemptuously calling Pompey 'the young pup' and Metellus 'the old woman' Sertorius proved himself more than a match for his adversaries. After the Battle of Lauron, in which he out-generaled Pompey and massacred part of his army, he razed the city (proving Pompey and Metellus could not protect their allies). In 75 BC, Pompey and Metellus made a comeback, Pompey defeated Sertorius' legates Herrenius and Perpenna in the Battle of Valentia and Metellus was able to crush another Sertorian army when he defeated Hirtuleius at the Battle of Italica. Sertorius responded by marching against Pompey and nearly capturing him at the Battle of Sucro, when Pompey decided to fight him without waiting for Metellus. After these battles Sertorius was indecisively beaten at the Battle of Saguntum and had to revert to guerrilla combat again. Pompey wrote to Rome for reinforcements, without which, he said, he and Metellus would be driven from Hispania. With these reinforcements Pompey and Metellus were gaining the upper hand, grinding down their enemy by war of attrition, capturing stronghold after stronghold. Though Sertorius was still able to win some victories, he was losing the war, and his authority over his men was declining. He lost much of his acumen and authority, descending into alcoholism and debauchery.

Sertorius was in league with the Cilician Pirates, who had bases and fleets all around the Mediterranean, was negotiating with the formidable Mithridates VI of Pontus, and he was also in communication with the insurgent slaves of Spartacus in Italy. But due to jealousies among his high ranking Roman officers and some Iberian chieftains as well a conspiracy was beginning to take form.

Death
In 74 and 73 BC, Pompey and Metellus had been slowly grinding down Sertorius's rebellion. Unable to defeat him in battle they had opted for attritional warfare, what had worked against Hannibal a century and a half before would now be brought to bear on Sertorius. Metellus, seeing that the key to victory was removing Sertorius, had made his pitch toward the Romans still with Sertorius. 'Should any Roman kill Sertorius he would be given a hundred talents of silver and twenty-thousand acres of land. If he was an exile he would be free to return to Rome'. This turned Sertorius paranoid, he started distrusting his Roman retinue. He also no longer trusted his Roman bodyguard, exchanging it for a Spanish one.

The war was not going well, so the Roman aristocrats and senators who made up the higher classes of his domain became discontented with Sertorius. They had grown jealous of Sertorius's power, and Perperna, aspiring to take Sertorius's place, encouraged that jealousy for his own ends. The conspirators took to damaging Sertorius by oppressing the local Iberian tribes in his name. This stirred discontent and revolt in the tribes, which resulted in a cycle of oppression and revolt, with Sertorius none the wiser as to who was creating such mischief.

Perperna and his fellow conspirator invited Sertorius to a feast to celebrate a supposed victory. While under most circumstances, any festivities to which Sertorius was invited were conducted with great propriety, this particular feast was vulgar, designed to offend the skillful general and get him off his couch and among the crowd where a knife could be shoved through his ribs without difficulty. Disgusted, Sertorius changed his posture on the couch, intent on ignoring them all. This presented something of a problem as Sertorius, although in late middle age, had a well deserved reputation as a skilled fighter. They changed their tactic, Perperna gave the signal to his fellow conspirators, and they rushed and stabbed the unsuspecting Sertorius until he was dead.

Aftermath 
Upon learning of the death of Sertorius, some of his Iberian allies sent ambassadors to Pompey or Metellus and made peace. Most simply went home. To make matters worse for Perperna, Sertorius's will named Perperna his chief beneficiary. Already disgraced as the man who had slain his commander, the man who had given him sanctuary, Perperna was now also revealed to have killed his main benefactor and friend. And now that he was dead, the virtues of Sertorius were remembered, and his recent atrocities forgotten.

People are generally less angry with those who have died, and when they no longer see him alive before them they tend to dwell tenderly on his virtues. So it was with Sertorius. Anger against him suddenly turned to affection and the soldiers clamorously rose up in protest against Perperna.

Sertorius's independent "Roman" Republic in Spain crumbled with the renewed onslaught of Pompey and Metellus, who crushed Perperna's army and eliminated the remaining opposition.

Many commentators described Sertorius's life as a tragedy. Spann concluded, "Sertorius' talents were wasted, his life lost, in an inglorious struggle he did not want, could not win, and could not escape".

In fiction
 The 1662 French play Sertorius by Pierre Corneille and the 1679 English play Sertorius by John Bancroft both portray the events of the rebellion
In Colleen McCullough's novels The First Man in Rome and Fortune's Favourites, Quintus Sertorius features as one of the secondary characters.
In Steven Saylor's short story The White Fawn, Quintus Sertorius features as one of the secondary characters.
In Vincent B. Davis II (Author) novel, The Man With Two Names: A Novel of Ancient Rome (The Sertorius Scrolls Book 1) Quintus Sertorius is the main character

See also
 Sertoria gens
 Sertorian War
 Timeline of Portuguese history

Notes and references

Bibliography

Ancient sources

 Plutarch, Parallel Lives, Life of Sertorius (in his Parallel Lives Plutarch pairs Sertorius with Eumenes − Plutarch saw many parallels between the lives of these two men)
 Plutarch, Parallel Lives, Life of Pompey, 18.
 Appian, Bell. civ. (Civil Wars).
 Appian, Hispanica.
 the fragments of Sallust.
 Dio Cassius xxxvi.
 Frontinus, Stratagems

Modern sources
 
 
 John Leach, Pompey the Great, chapter 2. (1978)
 
 
 

120s BC births
Year of birth uncertain
73 BC deaths
2nd-century BC Romans
1st-century BC Romans
Ancient Roman exiles
Ancient Roman generals
Assassinated military personnel
Assassinated Roman politicians
People from Norcia
Roman governors of Hispania
Roman quaestors
Roman rebels
Roman Republican praetors
Romans who received the grass crown